Holmsley is a closed railway station in the county of Hampshire which served rural settlements in the New Forest.

History

The station was opened in 1847 as "Christchurch Road" by the Southampton and Dorchester Railway. Sited next to a bridge carrying the A35 road over the line, it was initially the nearest station for the towns of Christchurch and Bournemouth. Coaches served these places until the construction of direct lines, from firstly Ringwood and then Brockenhurst. The station's name was changed to Holmsley on 13 November 1862.

The station fell under the control of the London and South Western Railway before becoming part of the Southern Railway in the 1923 railway grouping. The station closed in 1964, a casualty of the programme of closures advocated by the Beeching Report.

The site today

The Burley to Brockenhurst road passes under the A35 through the platforms, using the former trackbed for some distance. However, remains of the platforms can be seen, and the station house survives as a restaurant at the road junction.

References

External links
 Holmsley station on navigable 1946 O. S. map

Disused railway stations in Hampshire
Former London and South Western Railway stations
Railway stations in Great Britain opened in 1847
Railway stations in Great Britain closed in 1964
Beeching closures in England
1847 establishments in England